Sascha Ley (born September 13, 1967 in Saarbrücken, Germany) is a German-Luxembourgish singer, songwriter, composer, actress and producer, best known for her work in the jazz genre.

Ley studied in Amsterdam, Luxembourg, Saarbrücken and in Mumbai, India. She began in the early 1990s working for theatre and film. In 2005 she was awarded as “Studio Hamburg European Shooting Star” for Luxembourg at the Berlin Film Festival Berlinale.

In summer 2009, Sascha Ley's trio Kalima wins the Audiences Choice Award (Prix du public) at the festival Tremplin Jazz d'Avignon in France.

Sascha Ley is based in Luxembourg and performs internationally.

References

External links
 Official Website

20th-century Luxembourgian women singers
Luxembourgian composers
Luxembourgian jazz singers
1967 births
Living people
21st-century Luxembourgian women singers